Gary Hughes (born 5 July 1964) is an English hard rock singer, songwriter and musician. Apart from his work as a solo artist, Gary Hughes is the front man and main songwriter of Hard Rock/Melodic Rock band Ten. He has also worked as a producer and songwriter on Bob Catley's first three solo albums and more recently on Serpentine's third studio album,  Circle of Knives. He has also produced Hugo's first album and has appeared on Vinny Burns' The Journey solo album and on the Ayreonauts Only album by the band Ayreon.

Biography
Gary Hughes started playing guitar when he was nine years old and a schoolboy at Sale Boys' Grammar School.

His musical career started in 1989 when Hughes released his first album, Big Bad Wolf (renamed and re-released with extra tracks in 1992 as Strength of Heart) through the Polygram Oslo label in Germany and Norway.

In 1992, Hughes signed with the then newly formed Now & Then Records and his forthcoming self titled album was the first one released on that label.

In 1995, Hughes and former Dare members Vinny Burns on guitar and Greg Morgan on drums begun working on what were to be his third and fourth solo albums. The sessions lead to the formation of the melodic hard rock band Ten.

Between The Robe and Spellbound albums, Hughes released his third solo album named Precious Ones. Precious Ones met with critical acclaim especially in Japan. In 2002, he undertook his most ambitious project yet; the two-album wide rock opera named Once And Future King that was based on King Arthur's myths and legends. The albums were released six months apart from each other and featured the vocals of Bob Catley, Lana Lane, Doogie White, Danny Vaughn, Sean Harris and others.

Hughes wrote and produced Bob Catley's first three solo albums, as well as Hugo's first solo release. Though he has been leading a band for over a decade, he continues to release solo albums as well as working as a songwriter, producer and musician for other artists. His latest release was the 2007 solo album named Veritas which saw a return to his AOR/melodic rock roots, following the Once And Future King project.

In September 2012, Hughes announced on his personal Facebook page that he will be producing and co-writing the new studio album of the band Serpentine. The follow-up album to the highly acclaimed Albion, Isla De Muerta, was released on 20 May via Rocktopia Records, with the band's first EP in 16 years entitled The Dragon And Saint George, following on 4 September. In March 2016, it was announced that his band Ten had signed a new contract with Frontiers Records, for a multi-album deal, starting with the release of Gothica, Ten's 13th studio album in July 2017 and the reissue of the band's back catalogue under the name "Opera Omnia".

In May 2018, he started working on Ten's 14th studio album Illuminati, which was released in November of the same year, through Frontiers Records, while in December 2020, his label Frontiers Records announced the forthcoming release of his seventh solo studio album entitled Waterside and a double CD compilation album featuring tracks from his back catalogue, entitled Decades. Both albums will be released on the 12th of March, 2021. Among the other projects, Hughes is working on a new rock opera project and the debut album of a female singer.

Discography

Solo albums 
 Big Bad Wolf (1989)
 Strength of Heart (1990)
 Gary Hughes (1992)
 Precious Ones (1998)
 In Your Eyes EP (1998)
 Once and Future King Part I (2003)
 Once and Future King Part II (2003)
 Veritas (2007)
 Waterside (2021)

Compilation albums
 The Reissues (2000) (Re-Issue of Gary Hughes and Precious Ones)
 Decades (2021)

Ten

Studio albums
 X (1996)
 The Name of the Rose (1996)
 The Robe (1997)
 Spellbound (1999)
 Babylon (2000)
 Far Beyond the World (2001)
 Return to Evermore (2004)
 The Twilight Chronicles (2006)
 Stormwarning (2011)
 Heresy and Creed (2012)
 Albion (2014)
 Isla De Muerta (2015)
 Gothica (2017)
 Illuminati (2018)
 Here Be Monsters (2022)
 Somthing Wicked This Way Comes (2023)

Live albums
 Never Say Goodbye (1998)

Compilation albums
 The Best of Ten 1996-1999 (1999)
 Ten/The Name of the Rose (1999)
 The Robe/Bonus Collection (1999)
 The Essential Collection 1995-2005 (2006)
 Battlefield - The Rocktopia Records Collection - Limited Release (2016)
 Opera Omnia: The Complete Works (2019)

EPs
 The Name of the Rose (1996)
 The Robe (1997)
 You're in My Heart (1997)
 Fear the Force (1999)
 The Dragon And Saint George (2015)

Other projects

Hugo
 Hugo (1997)

Bob Catley
The Tower (1998)
Legends (1999)
Middle Earth (2001)

Vinny Burns
The Journey (1999)

Johnny Lima
 Shine On (1999)

Ayreon
 Ayreonauts Only (2000)

Serpentine
 Circle of Knives (2015)

References

External links 
Ten Official Website

1967 births
Living people
English male singers
English rock singers
English songwriters
Musicians from Manchester
Ten (band) members
British male songwriters